The Snowman Trek is the longest hiking trail of Bhutan that extends from Laya to the high Bhutanese Himalayas, covering up the northern part of the Kingdom. It was created by the yak herders of the country.

It is one of the hardest trekking trails due to hard weather, duration, and altitude in the world and most of the trekkers do not complete the route. It begins from Lunana to higher up in Gangkar Puensum, and ends in Trongsa and from there to Bumthang District, taking through the rough paths of the Himalayas and up to as high as 5000m above sea level. The route leads through remote villages, lakes, eleven mountain passes and overlooks some of the highest mountains of the Kingdom like Jomolhari, Jichu Drake, Gangkar Puensum, Masangang and Tiger Mountain. It was also reported that the snow leopards can be found on the way, although there has been no reports of danger to trekkers.

References 

Himalayas
Hiking trails in Asia
Geology of Bhutan